Sahel Academy is a Christian international school in Niamey, Niger. It was established by SIM in 1987.

It educates the children of missionaries and the English-speaking people of Niamey. During the 2013–2014 school year, Sahel Academy had 200 students in grades K-12, representing 14 countries, and a staff of 40 from four nations. The school offers an English-speaking international curriculum, consisting of IGCSE (from Cambridge) for grades 9–10. Sahel Academy has been accredited by the ACSI and MSS-CESS.

Location 

Sahel Academy occupies an 1.2-acre (5,000 m2) site in the Koira Kano area of Niamey.

References 

Schools in Niger
Education in Niamey
Educational institutions established in 1987
1987 establishments in Niger